Sturle is a given name. Notable people with the given name include:

Sturle Dagsland, Norwegian singer
Sturle Holseter (born 1976), Norwegian ski jumper